The 59th Golden Horse Awards was held on November 19, 2022, at the Sun Yat-sen Memorial Hall in Taipei, Taiwan. Organized by the Taipei Golden Horse Film Festival Executive Committee, the awards honored the best in Chinese-language films of 2021 and 2022. Nominations were announced on September 27, 2022. Despite receiving the warning from Chinese authorities, Hong Kong action thriller Limbo led the nominations with 14, while Taiwanese films Incantation and Coo-Coo 043 each received 13 nominations.

Taiwanese drama Coo-Coo 043 won Best Narrative Feature, while Limbo was the biggest winner overall with 4 awards, mostly won technical categories, followed by The Sunny Side of the Street with 3, including Best Leading Actor.

The ceremony
Cinematographer Mark Lee Ping-bing leads the awards executive committee for the first time, taking over the duties of former head Ang Lee.
The 59th Golden Horse Awards is tentatively the last edition held at the Taipei Sun Yat-sen Memorial Hall, as the venue undergoes refurbishment til 2025.
The Narrow Road was disqualified from the Best Original Film Song nomination ("On the Road"), after the awards executive committee was informed by the film distributor MM2 Studios that the song had been publicly performed prior to the film production.
The 17-person jury unanimously decided Anthony Wong (The Sunny Side of the Street) as the winner for Best Leading Actor, Hu Jhih-ciang (Coo-Coo 043) for Best New Performer, and Limbo for Best Cinematography and Best Adapted Screenplay, among others.
There were also 7 award categories where the winners were a close call (9 votes versus 8 votes), the most categories in the awards history. They were:
Coo-Coo 043 winning Limbo (Best Narrative Feature)
Laha Mebow (Gaga) winning Cheang Pou-soi (Limbo) for Best Director
Sylvia Chang (A Light Never Goes Out) winning Cya Liu (Limbo)  for Best Leading Actress
Kagaw Piling (Gaga) winning Yang Li-yin (Coo-Coo 043) for Best Supporting Actress
Sheu Fang-yi (Salute) winning Jack Wong Wai-leung (Limbo) for Best Action Choreography
And Miles to Go Before I Sleep winning Silence in the Dust for Best Documentary Feature
Will You Look at Me winning Kaohsiung City, Yancheng District, Fubei Rd., No. 31 for Best Documentary Short Film.
No jury member raised the possibility of a tie (split between two winners) for all the 23 award categories.

Winners and nominees 

Winners are listed first and highlighted in boldface.

Jury
Winners will be jointly voted by six final stage jurors, along with eleven shortlist stage jurors who earlier decided the nominees.

Final stage jurors
 Ann Hui, Hong Kong filmmaker (Jury President)
 Gwei Lun-mei, Taiwanese actress
 Chang Chen, Taiwanese actor
 Cheng Wei-hao, Taiwanese filmmaker
 Yeh Ju-feng, Taiwanese film producer
 Yu Jing-pin, Taiwanese cinematographer

Shortlist stage jurors
 Chou I-wen, Taiwanese cinematographer
 Chiu Li-wei, Taiwanese animation director
 Silver Cheung, Hong Kong production designer
 Chang Jung-chi, Taiwanese film director
 Chang Yao-sheng, Taiwanese filmmaker and novelist
 Allen Leung, Hong Kong film editor
 Huang Hui-chen, Taiwanese documentary filmmaker
 Essay Liu, Taiwanese screenwriter
 Henry Tsai, Taiwanese filmmmaker
 Penny Tsai, Taiwanese production designer
 Henry Lai, Hong Kong composer

FIPRESCI Prize jury
 Ernesto Diezmartínez, Mexican film critic
 Estella Huang, Taiwanese film critic and writer
 Jason Tan Liwag, Filipino scientist, actor, writer and film programmer

NETPAC Award jury
 Cecilia Wong, Hong Kong film critic and film programmer 
 Singing Chen, Taiwanese film director
 Tan Tang-mo, Taiwanese film critic

See also
 40th Hong Kong Film Awards

References

External links
 Official website of the Golden Horse Awards

59th
2022 film awards
2022 in Taiwan